Charles Eden (1673 – 26 March 1722) was a British colonial official who served as the second Governor of the Province of North Carolina from 1714 until his death in 1722.

Governor of North Carolina
Eden was appointed Governor of North Carolina on 28 May 1714. He is best known for his connections with various locally based pirates. Gentleman pirate Stede Bonnet and the notorious Blackbeard (Edward Teach) surrendered to Governor Eden and received the King's Pardon upon promising to change their ways. Both, however, would eventually return to piracy.
 
In 1719 prominent North Carolinian Edward Moseley accused Governor Eden of profiting from Blackbeard's crimes. Moseley was arrested and fined for his accusations. Eden's secretary of the governor's council, Tobias Knight, was implicated when a letter written to Teach was found on the pirate's body at his death and by the fact that the cargo taken from a ship captured by Teach was housed in Knight's barn. Knight's letter mentioned the governor's desire to meet with Blackbeard and this was considered sufficient evidence that Eden colluded with the pirates, but no further proof was forthcoming. Eden presented an account of his dealings with Blackbeard to the provincial council, which accepted his pleas of innocence. Nevertheless, Eden's reputation has long been clouded by his connections to Blackbeard.

Eden died of yellow fever in Bertie County in 1722 at the age of 48. Edenton, North Carolina is named for him.  His remains were later reinterred in the churchyard of St. Paul's Episcopal Church at Edenton.

Personal life
Eden's step-daughter Penelope married Gabriel Johnston, the sixth Governor of North Carolina. His great-grandson through that marriage was United States Congressman William Johnston Dawson.

In popular culture
Eden was featured as a character in the Hallmark Entertainment mini series Blackbeard, played by Richard Chamberlain. The film takes severe dramatic license, portraying Eden as the governor of New Providence, the island which is now the capital of the Bahamas, as opposed to his real occupation as Governor of North Carolina. The film also puts heavy emphasis on Eden's historically alleged trade with Blackbeard, while also claiming that he conspired with colonial secretary Tobias Knight to arrange the murder of Eden's stepdaughter in order to claim her inheritance.

References

Further reading
 Woodard, Colin. The Republic of Pirates. Harcourt, New York, NY. (2007).

External links

 

1673 births
1722 deaths
Burials in North Carolina
Deaths in North Carolina
Governors of North-Carolina (1712–1776)
Landgraves of Carolina
Piracy